The 2015 Florida Gators baseball team represented the University of Florida in the sport of baseball during the 2015 college baseball season.  The Gators competed in the Eastern Division of the Southeastern Conference (SEC).  They played their home games at Alfred A. McKethan Stadium on the university's Gainesville, Florida campus.  The team was coached by Kevin O'Sullivan in his eighth season as Florida head coach.  The Gators entered the season hoping to build upon their performance in the 2014 NCAA Tournament, where they were eliminated after consecutive losses to the College of Charleston and North Carolina.

Roster

By player

By position

Coaching staff

Schedule

! style="background:#FF4A00;color:white;"| Regular Season
|- valign="top" 

|- bgcolor="#ddffdd"
| February 13 ||  || No. 5 || McKethan Stadium || 9–1 || Shore (1–0) || Moyers (0–1) || None || 3,404 || 1–0 || –
|- bgcolor="#ddffdd"
| February 14 || Rhode Island || No. 5 || McKethan Stadium || 22–3 || Dunning (1–0) || Distasio (0–1) || None || 3,283 || 2–0 || –
|- bgcolor="#ddffdd"
| February 15 || Rhode Island || No. 5 || McKethan Stadium || 6–1 || Puk (1–0) || Whitman (0–1) || None || 3,210 || 3–0 || –
|- bgcolor="#bbbbbb"
| February 17 || Florida A&M || No. 5 || McKethan Stadium || colspan=7 | Canceled (rain) 
|- bgcolor="#ddffdd"
| February 18 || at South Florida || No. 5 || Tampa, FL || 13–3 || Morales (1–0) || Peterson (0–1) || None || 2,059 || 4–0 || –
|- bgcolor="#ddffdd"
| February 20 || No. 14 Miami (FL)Rivalry || No. 5 || McKethan Stadium || 4–3 || Lewis (1–0) || Mediaville (0–1) || None || 3,661 || 5–0 || –
|- bgcolor="#ffdddd"
| February 21 || No. 14 Miami (FL)Rivalry || No. 5 || McKethan Stadium || 2–7 || Woodrey (2–0) || Puk (1–1) || None || 6,081 || 5–1 || –
|- bgcolor="#ddffdd"
| February 22 || No. 14 Miami (FL)Rivalry|| No. 5 || McKethan Stadium || 2–1 || Dunning (2–0) || Sosa (1–1) || Lewis (1) || 4,734 || 6–1 || –
|- bgcolor="#ddffdd"
| February 24 || at  || No. 5 || Roger Dean StadiumJupiter, FL || 10–8 || Vinson (1–0) || Carr (0–1) || Lewis (2) || 2,181 || 7–1 || –
|- bgcolor="#ddffdd"
| February 27 ||  || No. 5 || McKethan Stadium || 1–0 || Shore (2–0) || Knesnik (0–2) || Poyner (1) || 2,602 || 8–1 || –
|- bgcolor="#ddffdd"
| February 28 || Stony Brook || No. 5 || McKethan Stadium || 14–3 || Puk (2–1) || Honahan (1–1) || None || 2,721 || 9–1 || –
|-

|- bgcolor="#ddffdd"
| March 1 || Stony Brook || No. 5 || McKethan Stadium || 6–2 || Dunning (3–0) || Zamora (1–1) || Lewis (3) || 3,222 || 10–1 || –
|- bgcolor="#ffdddd"
| March 3 || at No. 14 UCF || No. 2 || Jay Bergman FieldOrlando, FL || 3–4 || Hukari (3–0) || Poyner (0–1) || Thompson (2) || 4,319 || 10–2 || –
|- bgcolor="#ddffdd"
| March 4 || No. 14 UCF || No. 2 || McKethan Stadium || 10–2 || Snead (1–0) || Hepple (1–1) || None || 2,705 || 11–2 || –
|- bgcolor="#ddffdd"
| March 6 ||  || No. 2 || McKethan Stadium || 5–0 || Shore (3–0) || Courtney (0–4) || None || 2,803 || 12–2 || –
|- bgcolor="#ddffdd"
| March 7 || Maine || No. 2 || McKethan Stadium || 6–1 || Puk (3–1) || Heath (2–1) || Young (1) || 3,153 || 13–2 || –
|- bgcolor="#ddffdd"
| March 8 || Maine || No. 2 || McKethan Stadium || 5–3 || Dunning (4–0) || Marks (0–3) || Lewis (4) || 3,147 || 14–2 || –
|- bgcolor="#ddffdd"
| March 10 ||  || No. 3 || McKethan Stadium || 8–7 || Hanhold (1–0) || Wallace (0–1) || Lewis (5) || 2,458 || 15–2 || –
|- bgcolor="#ddffdd"
| March 11 || Fairfield || No. 3 || McKethan Stadium || 6–1 || Faedo (1–0) || Howell (0–2) || None || 2,435 || 16–2 || –
|- bgcolor="#ffdddd"
| March 13 ||  || No. 3 || McKethan Stadium || 3–6 || Marks (2–1) || Shore (3–1) || Lee (3) || 3,516 || 16–3 || 0–1 
|- bgcolor="#ddffdd"
| March 14 || Tennessee || No. 3 || McKethan Stadium || 8–3 || Puk (4–1) || Owenby (1–2) || Poyner (2) || 3,918 || 17–3 || 1–1
|- bgcolor="#ddffdd"
| March 15 || Tennessee || No. 3 || McKethan Stadium || 9–4 || Young (1–0) || Serrano (1–2) || None || 3,648 || 18–3 || 2–1
|- bgcolor="#ddffdd"
| March 17 || No. 11 Florida StateRivalry || No. 3 || McKethan Stadium || 14–8 || Vinson (2–0) || Carlton (1–1) || None || 5,827 || 19–3 || –
|- bgcolor="#ffdddd"
| March 20 || at  || No. 3 || Swayze FieldOxford, MS || 1–4 || Trent (4–1) || Shore (3–2) || Weathersby (2) || 9,065 || 19–4 || 2–2
|- bgcolor="#ffdddd"
| March 21 (1) || at Ole Miss || No. 3 || Swayze Field || 2–5 || Bramlett (3–1) || Puk (4–2) || Short (2) || 9,761 || 19–5 || 2–3
|- bgcolor="#ddffdd"
| March 21 (2) || at Ole Miss || No. 3 || Swayze Field || 8–4 || Poyner (1–1) || Stokes (0–1) || None || 9,761 || 20–5 || 3–3
|- bgcolor="#ddffdd"
| March 24 || at  || No. 5 || Melching FieldDeLand, FL || 9–6 || Browning (1–0) || Warmoth (0–1) || Lewis (6) || 2,016 || 21–5 || –
|- bgcolor="#bbbbbb"
| March 26 || Alabama || No. 5 || McKethan Stadium || colspan=7 | Postponed (rain); Makeup: March 27 
|- bgcolor="#ffdddd"
| March 27 (1) || Alabama || No. 5 || McKethan Stadium ||  || Castillo (3–0) || Lewis (1–1) || None || 3,123 || 21–6 || 3–4
|- bgcolor="#ddffdd"
| March 27 (2) || Alabama || No. 5 || McKethan Stadium || 8–1 || Shore (4–2) || Carter (1–3) || None || 3,123 || 22–6 || 4–4
|- bgcolor="#ddffdd"
| March 28 || Alabama || No. 5 || McKethan Stadium || 7–4 || Puk (5–2) || Hubbard (2–2) || None || 4,367 || 23–6 || 5–4
|- bgcolor="#ffdddd"
| March 31 || vs. No. 8 Florida StateRivalry || No. 5 || Baseball GroundsJacksonville, FL || 3–8 || Holtmann (4–1) || Faedo (1–1) || Silva (1) || 8,306 || 23–7 || –
|-

|- bgcolor="#ddffdd"
| April 3 || at Missouri || No. 5 || Taylor StadiumColumbia, MO || 5–1 || Shore (5–2) || McClain (4–3) || None || 714 || 24–7 || 6–4
|- bgcolor="#ffdddd"
| April 4 || at Missouri || No. 5 || Taylor Stadium || 1–10 || Houck (5–1) || Puk (5–3) || None || 1,855 || 24–8 || 6–5
|- bgcolor="#ffdddd"
| April 5 || at Missouri || No. 5 || Taylor Stadium || 3–5 || Fairbanks (3–3) || Dunning (4–1) || None || 1,051 || 24–9 || 6–6
|- bgcolor="#ddffdd"
| April 7 || Stetson || No. 10 || McKethan Stadium || 22–2 || Faedo (2–1) || Schaly (3–3) || None || 2,690 || 25–9 || –
|- bgcolor="#ddffdd"
| April 10 || No. 21 South Carolina || No. 10 || McKethan Stadium || 14–3 || Poyner (3–1) || Crowe (3–4) || None || 5,060 || 26–9 || 7–6
|- bgcolor="#ddffdd"
| April 11 || No. 21 South Carolina || No. 10 || McKethan Stadium || 12–5 || Puk (6–3) || Wynkoop (4–4) || None || 5,076 || 27–9 || 8–6
|- bgcolor="#ddffdd"
| April 12 || No. 21 South Carolina || No. 10 || McKethan Stadium || 12–2 || Faedo (3–1) || Widener (1–3) || None || 2,997 || 28–9 || 9–6
|- bgcolor="#ffdddd"
| April 14 || at No. 13 Florida StateRivalry || No. 7 || Tallahassee, FL || 3–412 || Strode (2–0) || Rubio (0–1) || None || 6,634 || 28–10 || –
|- bgcolor="#ddffdd"
| April 17 || at Mississippi State || No. 7 || Dudy Noble FieldStarkville, MS || 6–3 || Shore (6–2) || Laster (4–3) || None || 9,492 || 29–10 || 10–6
|- bgcolor="#ddffdd"
| April 18 || at Mississippi State || No. 7 || Dudy Noble Field || 2–1 || Rhodes (1–0) || Brown (5–4) || Poyner (3) || 13,004 || 30–10 || 11–6
|- bgcolor="#ddffdd"
| April 19 || at Mississippi State || No. 7 || Dudy Noble Field || 10–5 || Lewis (2–1) || Sexton (3–4) || None || 7,507 || 31–10 || 12–6
|- bgcolor="#ddffdd"
| April 21 || Bethune–Cookman || No. 6 || McKethan Stadium || 2–1 || Poyner (3–1) || Clymer (0–3) || None || 2,446 || 32–10 || –
|- bgcolor="#ffdddd"
| April 24 ||  || No. 6 || McKethan Stadium || 0–3 || Brown (4–4) || Shore (6–3) || Salow (2) || 3,516 || 32–11 || 12–7
|- bgcolor="#ffdddd"
| April 25 || Kentucky || No. 6 || McKethan Stadium || 6–7 || Beggs (6–2) || Dunning (4–2) || Salow (3) || 4,419 || 32–12 || 12–8
|- bgcolor="#ddffdd"
| April 26 || Kentucky || No. 6 || McKethan Stadium || 10–3 || Faedo (4–1) || Nelson (2–3) || None || 2,825 || 33–12 || 13–8
|-

|- bgcolor="#ffdddd"
| May 1 || at  || No. 8 || Foley FieldAthens, GA || 1–11 || Soesbee (3–2) || Shore (6–4) || None || 3,038 || 33–13 || 13–9
|- bgcolor="#ddffdd"
| May 2 || at Georgia || No. 8 || Foley Field || 3–2 || Poyner (4–1) || McLaughlin (3–5) || None || 2,888 || 34–13 || 14–9
|- bgcolor="#ddffdd"
| May 3 || at Georgia || No. 8 || Foley Field || 7–4 || Lewis (3–1) || Walsh (4–2) || Young (2) || 2,883 || 35–13 || 15–9
|- bgcolor="#ddffdd"
| May 5 || South Florida || No. 9 || McKethan Stadium || 5–1 || Dunning (5–2) || Eveld (1–2) || None || 2,534 || 36–13 || –
|- bgcolor="#ffdddd"
| May 7 || at No. 8 Vanderbilt || No. 9 || Hawkins FieldNashville, TN || 0–2 || Fulmer (10–1) || Shore (6–5) || None || 3,626 || 36–14 || 15–10
|- bgcolor="#ddffdd"
| May 8 || at No. 8 Vanderbilt || No. 9 || Hawkins Field || 7–3 || Puk (7–3) || Pfeifer (3–4) || None || 3,626 || 37–14 || 16–10
|- bgcolor="#ddffdd"
| May 9 || at No. 8 Vanderbilt || No. 9 || Hawkins Field || 9–710 || Lewis (4–1) || Sheffield (4–2) || None || 3,626 || 38–14 || 17–10
|- bgcolor="#ffdddd"
| May 14 ||  || No. 7 || McKethan Stadium || 1–4 || Lipscomb (7–2) || Shore (6–6) || Camp (8) || 2,736 || 38–15 || 17–11
|- bgcolor="#ddffdd"
| May 15 || Auburn || No. 7 || McKethan Stadium || 4–3 || Rhodes (2–0) || McCord (5–4) || Snead (1) || 3,295 || 39–15 || 18–11
|- bgcolor="#ddffdd"
| May 16 || Auburn || No. 7 || McKethan Stadium || 3–1 || Lewis (5–1) || Rentz (3–3) || Poyner (4) || 3,175 || 40–15 || 19–11
|-

|-
! style="background:#FF4A00;color:white;"| Postseason
|-

|- bgcolor="#ffdddd"
| May 20 || vs. No. 24 (5) Arkansas ||  || Hoover, AL || 6–7 || Lowery (6–1) || Poyner (4–2) || Jackson (6) || 10,142 || 40–16 || 0–1
|- bgcolor="#ddffdd"
| May 21 || vs. (9) Auburn ||  || Metropolitan Stadium || 11–2 || Shore (7–6) || Rentz (3–4) || None || 6,526 || 41–16 || 1–1
|- bgcolor="#ddffdd"
| May 22 || vs. No. 24 (5) Arkansas ||  || Metropolitan Stadium || 10–07 || Puk (8–3) || Taccolini (6–4) || None || 10,329 || 42–16 || 2–1
|- bgcolor="#ddffdd"
| May 23 || vs. No. 1 (1) LSU ||  || Metropolitan Stadium || 2–1 || Lewis (6–1) || Stallings (1–2) || None || 10,949 || 43–16 || 3–1
|- bgcolor="#ddffdd"
| May 24 || vs. No. 9 (2) Vanderbilt ||  || Metropolitan Stadium || 7–3 || Young (2–0) || Johnson (5–1) || None || 10,590 || 44–16 || 4–1
|-

|- bgcolor="#ddffdd"
| May 29 || (4) Florida A&M ||  || McKethan Stadium || 19–0 || Shore (8–6) || Page (2–1) || None || 3,833 || 45–16 || 1–0
|- bgcolor="#ddffdd"
| May 30 || (3) South Florida ||  || McKethan Stadium || 8–2 || Puk (9–3) || Valdes (5–4) || None || 3,305 || 46–16 || 2–0
|- bgcolor="#ddffdd"
| May 31 ||  ||  || McKethan Stadium || 2–1 || Faedo (5–1) || Labsan (2–3) || Lewis (7) || 2,053 || 47–16 || 3–0
|-

|- bgcolor="#ddffdd"
| June 5 || No. 10 Florida StateRivalry ||  || McKethan Stadium || 13–5 || Shore (9–6) || Biegalski (7–5) || None || 5,709 || 48–16 || 1–0
|- bgcolor="#ddffdd"
| June 6 || No. 10 Florida StateRivalry ||  || McKethan Stadium || 11–4 || Poyner (5–2) || Compton (4–4) || None || 5,772 || 49–16 || 2–0
|-

|- bgcolor="#ddffdd"
| June 13 || vs. No. 8 (5) MiamiRivalry ||  || TD Ameritrade ParkOmaha, NE || 15–3 || Shore (10–6) || Suarez (9–2) || None || 26,377 || 50–16 || 1–0
|- bgcolor="#ffdddd"
| June 15 || vs. Virginia ||  || TD Ameritrade Park || 0–1 || Waddell (4–5) || Puk (9–4) || Sborz (15) || 19,544 || 50–17 || 1–1
|- bgcolor="#ddffdd"
| June 17 || vs. No. 8 (5) MiamiRivalry ||  || TD Ameritrade Park || 10–2 || Faedo (6–2) || Sosa (7–5) || None || 24,033 || 51–17 || 2–1
|- bgcolor="#ddffdd"
| June 19 || vs. Virginia ||  || TD Ameritrade Park || 10–5 || Shore (11–6) || Kirby (5–3) || None || 19,015 || 52–17 || 3–1
|- bgcolor="#ffdddd"
| June 20 || vs. Virginia ||  || TD Ameritrade Park || 4–5 || Sborz (6–2) || Lewis (6–2) || None || 15,560 || 52–18 || 3–2
|-

Rankings from USA Today/ESPN Top 25 coaches' baseball poll. Parentheses indicate tournament seedings. Retrieved from FloridaGators.com

Rankings

Gators in the MLB Draft

References

Florida Gators
Florida Gators baseball seasons
Florida
College World Series seasons